The King George VI Bridge is a bridge over the River Dee in Aberdeen, Scotland.

The foundation stone of the bridge was laid by the Lord Provost Edward W. Watt on 15 September 1938. It was officially opened by Queen Elizabeth in the presence of her husband King George VI on 10 December 1941. Today the bridge carries the Great Southern Road (B9077) into Aberdeen from the south.

See also
Transport in Aberdeen

References

External links 
 

Bridges completed in 1941
Road bridges in Scotland
Bridges across the River Dee, Aberdeenshire
Bridges in Aberdeen
1941 establishments in Scotland